Israel Gottlieb Canz (1690–1753) was a Protestant theologian and philosopher of Germany.

Life 
Israel Gottlieb Canz was born on 26 February 1690, at Grünthal. He studied at Tübingen, and took, in 1709, the degree of doctor of philosophy. In 1720 he was deacon at Nürtingen, and was, in 1734, appointed professor of elocution at Tübingen. In 1739 he was made professor of logic and metaphysics, and in 1747 professor of theology. He died there, on 2 February 1753.

Works 
From the first a decided opponent of the philosophy of Wolf, he had already prepared a large volume in refutation of it, when he perceived that he had passed an unfair judgment upon it. The book, which appeared later, was in effect an eloquent commentary upon that system, which he developed in connection with his colleague Bilfinger. Then he applied this philosophy to revealed theology. In moral theology he introduced a new choice of material, and especially new points of view. He wrote, among other works,

 Philosophiæ Leibnitianæ et Wolfianæ usus in Theologia (1728); 
 Positiones de Vocatione Ministrorum Ecclesiæ (1729);
 Diss. de Nexu Providentiæ Divinæ cum Litterarum Studio (1739);
 Theologia Thetico-polemica (Dresden, 1741);
 De jure Dei in res Creatas (1742);
 Oraculum 2 Samuel xxiii, 5 (1749);
 Explicatio Oraculi Psa. viii, 3 (1750);
 Compendium Theologiæ Purioris (1752, 3rd ed. 1761);
 Annotationes ad Compendium (1755).

References

Sources 

 Richter, Arthur (1876). "Canz, Israel Gottlieb". In Allgemeine Deutsche Biographie (ADB). Vol. 3. Leipzig: Duncker & Humblot. pp. 768–769.
 Wolfes, Matthias (2001). "Canz, Israel Gottlieb". In Biographisch-Bibliographisches Kirchenlexikon (BBKL). Vol. 18. Herzberg: Bautz. . pp. 243–256.

Attribution:

 Pick, B. (1885). "Canz, Israel Gottlieb". In McClintock, John; Strong, James (eds.). Cyclopædia of Biblical, Theological and Ecclesiastical Literature. Supplement.—Vol. 1. New York: Harper & Brothers. p. 781. 

1690 births
1753 deaths
18th-century German Protestant theologians
18th-century German philosophers
18th-century German writers
Academic staff of the University of Tübingen